Government Executive is an American media publication based in Washington, D.C., that covers daily government business for civilians, federal bureaucrats, and military officials. Government Executive is part of GovExec, which is owned by Growth Catalyst Partners.

Government Executive's first issue, published in March 1969, featured a formal portrait of Richard Nixon and the headline: "What Government Can Expect from President Nixon". In 1987, the magazine was acquired by the National Journal Group, which was itself acquired 10 years later by businessman David Bradley. In 1999, Bradley bought The Atlantic Monthly magazine and renamed his company Atlantic Media.

In 2007, Government Executive's information technology reporting was spun off into a new publication: NextGov, which covers technology and the future of government. In 2013, the company founded Defense One, which covers emerging national security issues. In 2015, it founded Route Fifty, which covers ideas in state and local government. The four publications, plus an associated events division and the Studio 2G content marketing division, became known as Government Executive Media Group.

In 2020, Atlantic Media sold Government Executive Media Group to Growth Catalyst Partners, a private-equity firm.  In 2021, City & State was acquired by Government Executive Media Group. 

In 2021, longtime editor-in-chief Tom Shoop stepped down and was replaced by Tanya Ballard Brown, most recently of NPR.

References

External links
 
 Nextgov
 Defense One
 Route Fifty

Business magazines published in the United States
Monthly magazines published in the United States
Magazines established in 1979
Magazines published in Washington, D.C.